Thomas Yate, D.D. (1604–1681), sometimes called Yates, was an Oxford college head.

Yate was educated at Brasenose College, Oxford. He held the living at Middleton Cheney; and was Principal of Brasenose from 1660 until his death on 22 April 1681.

Notes

Further reading

 

|

17th-century English Anglican priests
Alumni of Brasenose College, Oxford
Principals of Brasenose College, Oxford
1681 deaths